In the Book of Revelation, the two witnesses (duo martyron) are two prophets who are mentioned in Revelation 11:1-14. Christian eschatology interprets this as two people, two groups of people, or two concepts. Some believe they are Enoch and Elijah, as in the Gospel of Nicodemus, since they are the only two that did not see death as required by the Scriptures. Others believe them to be Moses and Elijah because they appeared during the transfiguration of Jesus, or because Enoch was not Abraham's descendant. Some also believe that they are Moses and Elijah due to the description of what they are to do. They have the power to shut the heavens (Elijah) and turn water into blood (Moses)

Dispensationalist Christians believe that the events described in the Book of Revelation will occur before and during the Second Coming.

Biblical narrative

Textual analysis 

According to the text, the two witnesses are the "two olive trees and the two lampstands" that have the power to destroy their enemies, control the weather and cause plagues. This description may be symbolism, allegory, or literal.

Exegesis 

In attempting to interpret Revelation 11, commentators who hold to a premillennial eschatology generally interpret the two witnesses in one of three ways:
 as individuals either manifested in some form of reincarnation; or "in the spirit" of biblical prophets who once appeared in Bible history; or simply as two individuals newly arrived on the earth;
 as corporate in nature (human) standing for the Church only or for Israel only; or both Israel and the Church; or for both Jewish and Gentiles believers in Jesus; or 
 as symbolism or an expression of biblical concepts (i.e., the Old and New Testaments; the Law and the Prophets; Mercy and Grace).

The literalist typically has a dispensationalist or literal interpretation that the two witnesses will be actual people who will appear in the last days. However, there are varying views as to their identity.

Modern theologians, such as John Walvoord, have furthered the point of individualism by comparing the "two lampstands" and the "two olive trees" of Revelation 11 to the two golden pipes and two olive trees/branches of Zechariah 4. By the identification of the two olive branches as "two anointed ones" or "two sons of the oil", in Zechariah, this reinforces the literalist interpretation that the two witnesses are two people. The personification of the two witnesses in Revelation is so prevalent that according to theologian William Barclay, the passage seems to refer to definite persons. Walvoord further pointed out that because the Revelation passage does not specifically identify who the two witnesses are, it would be safer to conclude that they are not related to any previous historical character.

As individuals 
The apocryphal Gospel of Nicodemus (also known as Acts of Pilate) states that those two witnesses who will appear in times of Antichrist to engage in battle with him are Enoch and Elijah: 
"3. One of them answering, said, I am Enoch, who was translated by the word of God: and this man who is with me, is Elijah the Tishbite, who was translated in a fiery chariot. 4. Here we have hitherto been, and have not tasted death, but are now about to return at the coming of Antichrist, being armed with divine signs and miracles, to engage with him in battle, and to be slain by him at Jerusalem, and to be taken up alive again into the clouds, after 3 days and a half." - Gospel of Nicodemus, Chapter 20:3-4.

Others have proposed Moses as one of the witnesses, for his ability to turn water into blood and the power to plague the earth.

Early Christian writers such as Tertullian, Irenaeus, and Hippolytus of Rome, have concluded that the two witnesses would be Enoch and Elijah, the two prophets who did not die because God "took" them according to other Biblical passages.

As symbols of the church 
The two witnesses have been interpreted as representing the Church or a similar concept. The 1599 Geneva Study Bible has asserted that the two witnesses are the exclusive purview of the church. Matthew Henry's Complete Commentary on the Whole Bible gives one church interpretation as consisting of believing Jews and that of the gentiles. John Wesley in his commentary on Revelation 11 suggests a more spiritual, almost ambiguous, application. John Gill's Exposition of the Bible interprets the two witnesses as the true Church in counterdistinction to the "antichrist system" of Roman Catholicism. Ross Taylor's Verse by Verse Commentary on Revelation clearly defines the Church as the "two olive trees and the two lampstands."

Similarly, the two witnesses have been identified as Israel and the Christian Church. The number two has been associated with the witness of Israel to the gentile nations during the 70th Week of Daniel's prophecy. The olive tree signifies Israel. The "witness of the Church" is signified by the two lampstands, whose identity was disclosed by the seven golden lampstands (i.e., candlesticks) revealed in Revelation 2-3 as the "churches". Revelation 2:1 refers to the churches as golden lampstands.

It has also been proposed that the two witnesses are the witnessing church, because Jesus sent out his disciples "two by two". The two witnesses are the true prophetic witness in Revelation (the church,) and they serve as the counterpart to the false prophetic witness, the beast from the land, who has two horns like a lamb (Rev. 13:11; cf.16:13; 19:20; 20:10).

Other views 
The Church of Jesus Christ of Latter-day Saints believe that the two witnesses will be two prophets who are sent to Jerusalem (raised up to the Jews) in the modern nation of Israel, possibly two members of their Quorum of the Twelve or their First Presidency, who are considered to be prophets by the church. These two prophets will represent both the ancient Northern and Southern kingdoms of Israel (the two olive trees) and be descendants of the two covenant sons from the tribes of Judah and Joseph (as the two lampstands).  Some members have suggested that the martyrdom of Joseph Smith and his brother Hyrum Smith (Assistant President from 1841 to 1844) are prototypes and they represent the future two witnesses (stated in Revelation) who will be sent to Jerusalem and be killed for their testimonies. 

In the Seventh-day Adventist interpretation, Uriah Smith and Ellen G. White considered the two witnesses to be the Old and New Testaments. This in turn is personified into two people, one taking off after the ways of God during the Old Testament, the other taking the ways after God in the New Testament. They believed that the French Revolution was the time when the two witnesses were killed. Other historicists also consider the two witnesses in this way.

The Baháʼí Faith identifies the two witnesses as Muhammed, the founder of Islam, and Ali, the son of Abú Tálib. They consider Muhammad as the root and Ali the branch, comparable to Moses and Joshua. They interpret "clothed in sackcloth" to mean that they initially appeared to be of no consequence and without a new revelation because the spiritual principles of Islam would correspond closely with those promulgated in Christianity and Judaism. They identify the "beast" to be the Umayyads, who would wage spiritual war against them. The 1,260 days is interpreted as the 1,260 lunar years since the start of the Islamic calendar, corresponding to the Gregorian year 1844; the year the Millerite movement also predicted the return of Christ. The Baháʼí Faith recognizes the significance of 1844 as the year of the declaration of the Báb, bearing a new message from God and proclaiming the coming of Baháʼu'lláh, the Prophet-Founder of the Baháʼí Faith and promised return of Christ.

Marshall Applewhite and Bonnie Nettles (Do and Ti), the leaders of the UFO religious cult Heaven's Gate, initially claimed to be the two witnesses in the 1970s. According to their interpretation, they would be killed and resurrected before ascending to heaven in a spacecraft. They ultimately rebranded their "assassinations" as symbolic rather than actual death, owing to the ridicule they were subjected to by the media.

In popular culture
The two witnesses play a central role in the supernatural drama television series Sleepy Hollow.  The first witness is Ichabod Crane, a Revolutionary War soldier who, after battling with the Horseman of Death (whom he causes to be headless), awakens in Sleepy Hollow in 2013.  The second witness is Lieutenant Abbie Mills, a contemporary woman in law enforcement who helps Crane adjust to the 21st century and aids him in battling dæmonic forces.  The two witnesses must face 'Seven Tribulations' (although other characters note that the Witnesses are only required to witness the events rather than take action themselves), the first being Moloch, the master of the Horsemen.  The second Tribulation is Pandora and her master, an ancient Sumerian god known as the Hidden One. Third was Malcolm Dryfus and Jobe. Although Lieutenant Mills (now Agent Mills of the F. B. I.) loses her soul, there must always be two witnesses, and the mantle passes on to Molly Thomas on her eleventh birthday.  Not long thereafter, Molly's older self, going by the name Lara, comes from the future to aid Crane in his battles, thereby assuming the mantle of the witness from her younger self.

In the Left Behind franchise, the two witnesses prophesy at the Wailing Wall in Jerusalem. They are later revealed to be Elijah and Moses, and are killed by the Antichrist Nicolae Carpathia.

See also 

 2300 day prophecy
 Day-year principle
 Events of Revelation (Chapter 11)
 Great Tribulation
 Prophecy of Seventy Weeks

Notes

References 
 
 
 

Biblical phrases
Book of Revelation
Christian terminology
Duos
Groups of Roman Catholic saints
Prophets of the New Testament
Unnamed people of the Bible